Platycephaloidei is a suborder of ray-finned fishes, part of the order Scorpaeniformes, and includes the flatheads, ghost flatheads and sea robins.

Taxonomy
Platycephaloidei was first recognised and named as a taxonomic grouping in 1943 by the Japanese ichthyologist Kiyomatsu Matsubara. The 5th edition of Fishes of the World classifies this group as a suborder within the Scorpaeniformes. Other authorities classify the families that make up Patycephaloidei in the 5th edition of Fishes of the World as two suborders; the Platycephaloidei, consisting of the families Bembridae, Parabembridae (separated from Bembridae), Platycephalidae, Hoplichthyidae and Plectrogeniidae (treated as a subfamily of Scorpaenidae in Fishes of the World) and the Trigloidei, including the families Triglidae and Peristediidae. The name of the suborder is taken from that of the type genus Platycephalus which means "flat head".

Families and subfamilies
The following families and subfamilies are classified within the suborder Platycephaloidei:
 Triglidae Rafinesque, 1815 (Gurnards and sea robins)
 Prionotinae Kaup, 1873
 Pterygotriglinae Fowler, 1938
 Triglinae Rafinesque, 1815
 Peristediidae Jordan & Gilbert, 1883 (Armoured searobins)
 Bembridae Kaup, 1873 (Deepwater flatheads)
 Platycephalidae Swainson, 1839 (Flatheads)
 Hoplichthyidae Kaup, 1873 (Ghost flatheads)

Characteristics
Platycephaloidei fishes are characterised by having elongate bodies with flattened heads which typically have ridges and spines. There are two separate dorsal fins, the pelvic fins are widely separated and have a single spine and typically 5 soft rays, although the pelvic fins of the genus Hoplichthys has 3 soft rays. The anal fin may contain 0, 1 or 3 spines and between 5 and 18 soft rays. They may or may not have a swimbladder.

Distribution and habitat
The Trigloidei are more widely distributed and are also demersal fishes occurring on the continental shelf on sand or mud substrates.

Fisheries
Platycephaloidei fishes are utilised by fisheries, some species of sea robins are of commercial importance and some flatheads are important food fishes, particularly in Australia.

References

Taxa named by Kiyomatsu Matsubara
 
Scorpaeniformes
Fish suborders